Verónica Cepede Royg and María Irigoyen were the defending champions, but Irigoyen chose not to participate. Cepede Royg partners Danka Kovinić, but lost in the quarterfinals to Mariana Duque and Julia Glushko.

Mariana Duque and Julia Glushko won the title, defeating Beatriz Haddad Maia and Nicole Melichar in the final, 1–6, 7–6(7–5), [10–4].

Seeds

Draw

References 
 Draw

Open Engie Saint-Gaudens Midi-Pyrénées - Doubles